is the head coach of the Haneda Vickies in the Women's Japan Basketball League.

Head coaching record

|- 
| style="text-align:left;"|Toyota Alvark
| style="text-align:left;"|2008-09
| 35||18||17|||| style="text-align:center;"|4th|||2||0||2||
| style="text-align:center;"|4th
|- 
| style="text-align:left;"|Toyota Alvark
| style="text-align:left;"|2009-10
| 42||20||22|||| style="text-align:center;"|6th|||-||-||-||
| style="text-align:center;"|-
|- 
| style="text-align:left;"|Hitachi High-Technologies Cougars
| style="text-align:left;"|2011-12
| 16||12||4|||| style="text-align:center;"|2nd in W1|||-||-||-||
| style="text-align:center;"|-
|- 
| style="text-align:left;"|Hitachi High-Technologies Cougars
| style="text-align:left;"|2012-13
| 22||5||17|||| style="text-align:center;"|10th|||-||-||-||
| style="text-align:center;"|-
|- 
| style="text-align:left;"|Aomori Wat's
| style="text-align:left;"|2013-14
| 52||27||25|||| style="text-align:center;"|6th in Eastern|||2||0||2||
| style="text-align:center;"|Lost in 1st round
|- 
| style="text-align:left;"|Aomori Wat's
| style="text-align:left;"|2014-15
| 52||23||29|||| style="text-align:center;"|6th in Eastern|||4||2||2||
| style="text-align:center;"|Lost in 2nd round
|- 
| style="text-align:left;"|Shinshu Brave Warriors
| style="text-align:left;"|2015-16
| 52||27||25|||| style="text-align:center;"|7th in Eastern|||2||0||2||
| style="text-align:center;"|Lost in 1st round
|- 
| style="text-align:left;"|Yamagata Wyverns
| style="text-align:left;"|2016-17
| 60||26||34|||| style="text-align:center;"|5th in B2 Eastern|||-||-||-||
| style="text-align:center;"|-
|- 
| style="text-align:left;"|Haneda Vickies
| style="text-align:left;"|2017-18
| 33||9||24|||| style="text-align:center;"|10th|||-||-||-||
| style="text-align:center;"|-
|- 
|- 
| style="text-align:left;"|Haneda Vickies
| style="text-align:left;"|2018-19
| 22||8||14|||| style="text-align:center;"|8th|||-||-||-||
| style="text-align:center;"|-
|-

References

1967 births
Alvark Tokyo coaches
Alvark Tokyo players
Aomori Wat's coaches
Japanese basketball coaches
Living people
Passlab Yamagata Wyverns coaches
Shinshu Brave Warriors coaches